East Smethport is an unincorporated community in McKean County, Pennsylvania, United States. The community is located at the intersection of U.S. Route 6 and Pennsylvania Route 46 near the eastern border of Smethport. East Smethport has a post office with ZIP code 16730.

References

Unincorporated communities in McKean County, Pennsylvania
Unincorporated communities in Pennsylvania